Beth Herr (born 28 May 1964) is an American tennis player from Centerville, Ohio, who won four Junior Grand Slam titles, the NCAA singles and team titles and one professional tennis tournament. In her home state of Ohio, she was a two-time high school singles state champion (1980-1981). Her NCAA singles title came in 1983.

College
Herr became the number-one junior tennis player in the world at the age of 16. Upon graduation from Centerville High School, she was the No. 1 college recruit in 1982 and played for the University of Southern California, where she won the NCAA singles title and team title in her first year. She beat Clemson University's Gigi Fernández in the third-set tiebreak, having faced a match point, to win the NCAA singles final.

Junior Grand Slam titles
In 1982, Herr won the 1982 French Open girls' doubles championship with Janet Lagasse, Herr also won the Wimbledon girls' doubles and US Open girls' doubles with Penny Barg, and won the US Open girls' singles in the same year.

Professional career
Herr cut short college and went directly into professional tennis after the NCAA Championship, and played on tour for 11 years, with wins over Pam Shriver, Hana Mandlíková, Martina Navratilova, Virginia Wade, and Mary Joe Fernández. In 1983, she lost a second-round singles match to Billie Jean King at Wimbledon, 6–8 in the third set. Commentators on HBO mentioned her ability to hit numerous swinging volleys for winners, something for which no female had previously been noted.

WTA career finals

Singles: 1 title

Personal life
After tennis, she finished her undergraduate degree at UCLA and then went to law school at UCLA. She married Tennis Channel founder Steve Bellamy and after a short stint as a lawyer at Manatt, Phelps and Phillips.

She later won the US Open and World Championships of paddle tennis and teamed with Scotty Freedman to become the greatest mixed-doubles team in the sports' 112-year history, as they were undefeated as a team from 2000 to 2007.

References

External links
 
 

Living people
1964 births
American female tennis players
American lawyers
Paddle tennis players
University of California, Los Angeles alumni
USC Trojans women's tennis players
Wimbledon junior champions
US Open (tennis) junior champions
Grand Slam (tennis) champions in girls' singles
Grand Slam (tennis) champions in girls' doubles
American women lawyers
UCLA School of Law alumni
Tennis people from Ohio